Elivelton Ubiratan Oliveira de Lima (born 13 October 1995), commonly known as Elivelton, is a Brazilian footballer who plays for Sergipe.

Career statistics

Club

References

1995 births
Living people
Brazilian footballers
Brazilian expatriate footballers
Association football defenders
Campeonato Brasileiro Série B players
Paraná Clube players
Boa Esporte Clube players
Paraná Soccer Technical Center players
FC Cascavel players
FC Tucson players
Lagarto Futebol Clube players
Club Sportivo Sergipe players
Brazilian expatriate sportspeople in the United States
Expatriate soccer players in the United States
Footballers from Curitiba